No Tears is an EP by Tuxedomoon, independently released in 1978.

Track listing

Accolades

Personnel 
Adapted from the No Tears liner notes.

Tuxedomoon
 Michael Belfer – guitar, EBow
 Steven Brown – vocals, synthesizer, drum programming
 Blaine L. Reininger – violin, guitar, backing vocals
 Winston Tong – vocals, cover art
 Paul Zahl – drums, drum programming

Production and additional personnel
 Adrian Craig – executive producer
 Victoria Lowe – photography
 Tom Tadlock – production
 Tuxedomoon – production, arrangement

Release history

References

External links 
 

1978 debut EPs
Tuxedomoon albums
Polydor Records EPs